is a type of Japanese classical music that was historically used for imperial court music and dances.  was developed as court music of the Kyoto Imperial Palace, and its near-current form was established in the Heian period (794-1185) around the 10th century. Today, it is performed by the Board of Ceremonies in the Tokyo Imperial Palace.

Gagaku consists of three primary repertoires:
Native Shinto religious music and imperial songs and dance, called 
Vocal music based on native folk poetry, called 
Songs and dance based on foreign-style music
A Chinese, Vietnamese and Indian form (specifically Tang Dynasty), called 
A Korean and Manchurian form, called 

, like , employ the yo scale, a pentatonic scale with ascending intervals of two, three, two, two, and three semitones between the five scale tones. Artistically it differs from the music of the corresponding Chinese form  which is a term reserved for ceremonial music.

History

In 589, Japanese official diplomatic delegations were sent to China (during the Sui dynasty) to learn Chinese culture, including Chinese court music. Various instruments, including these two, were the earliest used to play .

Even though the Japanese use the same term,  ( in Mandarin Chinese,  in Cantonese), the form of music imported from China was primarily banquet music rather than the ceremonial music of the Chinese . The importation of music peaked during the Tang Dynasty, and these pieces are called  (Tang music).  pieces that originated at a time earlier than Tang Dynasty are called  (ancient music), while those originating after the Tang Dynasty are called  (new music). The term  itself was first recorded in 701, when the first imperial academy of music  was established.

During the Nara period in the 8th century,  was performed at national events, such as the erection of the Great Buddha of Todai-ji Temple, by organizing  performance groups at large temples.

From the 9th century to the 10th century, during the Heian period, traditional  was developed further, becoming distinctly Japanese in style through its fusion with musical styles indigenous to Japan, changing it greatly.

The popularity of  reached its peak between the 9th and 10th centuries, when court aristocracy began to hold private concerts, but declined in the Kamakura period (1185-1333) when the power of the court aristocracy became diminished while that of the samurai rose.  was played by musicians who belonged to hereditary guilds. At this time, there were three guilds, based in Osaka, Nara and Kyoto.

Due to the Ōnin War, a civil war from 1467 to 1477 during the Muromachi period,  ensembles ceased to perform in Kyoto for about 100 years. In the Edo period, the Tokugawa Shogunate revived and reorganized the court-style ensembles, the direct ancestors of the present  ensembles.

After the Meiji Restoration of 1868, musicians from all three guilds came to the capital and their descendants make up most of the current Tokyo Imperial Palace Music Department.

 also accompanies classical dance performances called . It may be used in religious ceremonies in some Buddhist temples.

Today,  is performed in three ways:

This subgenre of contemporary works for  instruments, which began in the 1960s, is called . 20th-century composers such as Tōru Takemitsu have composed works for  ensembles, as well as individual  instruments. In January 2015 the Reigakusha  Ensemble and Ensemble Modern performed together Music with silent aitake's by Belgian composer Frederic D'Haene, making  and Western music co-exist.

Instruments used
Wind, string and percussion instruments are essential elements of gagaku music. Some instruments, such as Haishō, Gogen biwa, Kugo had been removed from the ensemble during Heian period and reconstructed based on the old documents and some remains of the instruments in the Shōsō-in during Showa Era.

Wind
, oboe

, transverse flute used in tōgaku
, mouth organ
, large mouth organ
, transverse flute smaller than ryūteki, used in komagaku
, also called chukan
, transverse flute larger than ryūteki, used in kuniburi no utamai

, panpipes

String
, 4-stringed lute
, 5-stringed lute
, 13-string zither of Chinese origin
, angled harp used in ancient times and recently revived

, zither of Japanese origin, with 6 or 7 strings

Percussion
, small gong, struck with two horn beaters
, small hourglass-shaped drum struck with two wooden sticks
, drum on a stand with ornately painted head, played with two padded sticks
, large drums used at festivals
, small, ornately decorated hourglass-shaped drum
, hourglass-shaped drum
, clapper made from a pair of flat wooden sticks

, a bell tree clapper, specific to Mikomai dance performed as Mi-kagura 
, hourglass drum, specific to Shirabyōshi dance performed as Mi-kagura

Influence on Western music
Beginning in the 20th century, several western classical composers became interested in gagaku, and composed works based on gagaku. Most notable among these are Henry Cowell (Ongaku, 1957), La Monte Young (numerous works of drone music, but especially Trio for Strings, 1958), Alan Hovhaness (numerous works), Olivier Messiaen (Sept haïkaï, 1962), Lou Harrison (Pacifika Rondo, 1963), Benjamin Britten (Curlew River, 1964), Bengt Hambraeus (Shogaku, from Tre Pezzi per Organo, 1967), Ákos Nagy (Veiled wince flute quartet 2010), Jarosław Kapuściński (numerous works), Sarah Peebles (numerous works), Michiko Toyama (Waka, 1960), and Tim Hecker (Konoyo, 2018).

One of the most important gagaku musicians of the 20th century, Masataro Togi (who served for many years as chief court musician), instructed American composers such as Alan Hovhaness and Richard Teitelbaum in the playing of gagaku instruments.

Other cultural influence
The American poet Steve Richmond developed a unique style based on the rhythms of gagaku. Richmond heard gagaku music on records at U.C.L.A.'s Department of Ethnomusicology in the early 1960s. In a 2009 interview with writer Ben Pleasants, Richmond claimed he had written an estimated 8,000–9,000 gagaku poems.

See also
Aak
Etenraku
Gigaku
Kagura
Nhã nhạc
Yayue

References

Alves, William. Music of the Peoples of the World. Thomson Schirmer, 2006.
Garfias, Robert. "Gradual Modifications of the Gagaku Tradition." Ethnomusicology, Vol. 4, No. 1. (Jan., 1960), pp. 16–19.
Matsumiya, Suiho. "Traditional Music in Japan To-Day: Its Stability and Evolution." Journal of the International Folk Music Council, Vol. 11 (1959), pp. 65–66.
Malm, William P. Japanese Music and Musical Instruments. Charles E. Japan: TuttleCo., Inc., 1959.

External links
Gagaku (Japanese Imperial Court Music) – The Imperial Household Agency
Gagaku – UNESCO
Gagaku Japanese Court Music & Dance
Ancient Japan: The Earliest Japanese Music
Gagaku music: Repertoire, Instruments and Orchestration

 
Japanese styles of music
Classical and art music traditions
Japanese traditional music
Intangible Cultural Heritage of Humanity
Japanese words and phrases